The Best of John Fahey 1959–1977 is a compilation album by American fingerstyle guitarist and composer John Fahey, released in 1977. The songs are collected from four of Fahey's dozen or so releases up to that point.

History
The original album consisted of tracks picked out by Fahey for the release, with two tracks "Spanish Two-Step" (called "Hawaiian Two-Step" on After the Ball) and "Dance of the Inhabitants of the Palace of King Philip XIV of Spain" re-recorded for the album.

 For the original release Guitar Player Magazine released a matching music folio of tablature for guitar. It also contained essays by Fahey, continuation of the tale of Blind Joe Death, and an ongoing story which meandered across the pages and the page margins throughout the book. In the introduction Fahey wrote:

 "While technique is important, it is only part of the story. Music is a language—a language of emotions. The worst possible way to play these songs—and I am not only talking about my own compositions—is in metronome time at a uniform volume. Another terrible thing would be to play any composition the same way every time, or to feel that you have to play it exactly the way someone else, such as myself, played it or said to play it. A good technician must also be creative. Even if a person is not a composer, he can interpret and arrange, and these skills are as important as technique in making a performance interesting. I rely heavily on both technique and interpretation, and I think of myself as a very good composer, arranger, and plagiarest for the solo acoustic guitar"

The book is no longer in print.

Reception

The original album received five stars in both editions of the Rolling Stone Record Guide.

Music critic Richie Unterberger called attention to Rhino's two-CD The Return of the Repressed: The John Fahey Anthology as "...a wider-spanning, lengthier chronological overview that's preferable for those wanting a fuller appreciation of [Fahey's] work." Unterberger also noted that "...what's here is good, important acoustic guitar music combining folk, blues, Americana, and unclassifiably weird originality, although it gives short shrift to some of his odder, more experimental 1960s and 1970s work."

Reissues
The Best of John Fahey was reissued on CD in 2002 by Takoma and included three bonus tracks taken from three later albums. It includes liner notes and commentary by such guitarists as Leo Kottke, Peter Lang, Jim O'Rourke, and George Winston, some of whom had recorded numerous Fahey compositions on their own albums or who were once signed to his Takoma label.

Track listing
All songs by John Fahey unless otherwise noted.
 "Sunflower River Blues" – 3:21
 "St. Louis Blues" (W. C. Handy) – 3:18
 "Poor Boy Long Ways from Home" – 2:27
 "When the Springtime Comes Again" (Fahey, Sullivan) – 4:55
 "Some Summer Day" – 3:27
 "Spanish Dance" – 2:07
 "Take a Look at That Baby" – 1:27
 "I'm Going to Do All I Can for My Lord" – 1:27
 "The Last Steam Engine Train" – 2:19
 "In Christ There Is No East or West" – 2:46
 "Give Me Cornbread When I'm Hungry" – 3:12
 "Dance of the Inhabitants of the Palace of King Philip XIV of Spain" – 3:19
 "Revolt of the Dyke Brigade" – 3:03
 "On the Sunny Side of the Ocean" – 3:54
 "Spanish Two-Step" – 2:21
2002 reissue bonus tracks:
 "America" – 7:43
 "Fare Forward Voyagers" – 23:39
 "Desperate Man Blues" – 3:59

Personnel
John Fahey – guitar
Production notes
ED Denson – producer
John Fahey – producer
Henry Kaiser – reissue producer, liner notes
Bob de Sousa – engineer
Dallas Jordan – engineer
John Judnich – engineer
Joe Tarantino – remastering
Stephen J. Cahill – cover photo
Linda Kalin – design
Jamie Putnam – art direction
Leo Kottke – commentary
Peter Lang – commentary
Michael Gulezian – commentary
Jim O'Rourke – commentary
Terry Robb – commentary
George Winston – commentary

References

1977 greatest hits albums
John Fahey (musician) compilation albums
Takoma Records compilation albums
Albums produced by John Fahey (musician)